Maurice Glenn Waterbury (September 26, 1875 – June 25, 1947) was an American football coach.  Waterbury was the head football coach at Kalamazoo College in Kalamazoo, Michigan.  He held that position for the 1901 season.  His coaching record at Kalamazoo was 2–5–1.

References

1875 births
1947 deaths
Kalamazoo Hornets football coaches
People from Ionia, Michigan